Matías Nicolás Caruzzo (born August 15, 1984 in Buenos Aires) is an Argentine footballer who plays as a defender for Argentine Primera División club Argentinos Juniors.

Playing career

Club 
Caruzzo came through Argentinos Juniors youth development system to make his professional debut on March 25, 2006 in a 3–1 away defeat to Gimnasia y Esgrima de Jujuy. He went on to establish himself as an important member of the first team squad.

Caruzzo was an important member of the Argentinos Juniors team that won the 2010 Clausura championship. He played in all 19 games and scored a vital goal in their 4–3 win against Independiente in the penultimate game of their championship winning campaign.

Caruzzo followed Argentinos Juniors 2010 Clausura champion coach Claudio Borghi to Boca Juniors for the dispute of the 2010–11 Argentine Primera División season. Boca paid Argentinos a 2,500,000 US dollars fee, plus a percentage of a future sell. In January 2014, Caruzzo signed a contract with Universidad de Chile for 3 years.

International 
On May 20, 2009 Caruzzo made his international debut in a friendly match against Panama. The Argentine team, made up of players based in the Argentine Primera División, won the game 3–1.

Honours

Club 
Argentinos Juniors
 Primera División: 1
 2010 Clausura
Boca Juniors
 Primera División: 1
 2011 Apertura
San Lorenzo
 Supercopa Argentina: 1
 2015

References

External links
 Argentine Primera statistics at Futbol XXI  
 
 Player profile at Football-Lineups.com
 Caruzzo, Matías Nicolás at Historia de Boca.com 
 

1984 births
Living people
Footballers from Buenos Aires
Argentine footballers
Argentine expatriate footballers
Argentina international footballers
Association football defenders
Argentinos Juniors footballers
Boca Juniors footballers
Universidad de Chile footballers
San Lorenzo de Almagro footballers
Chilean Primera División players
Argentine Primera División players
Primera Nacional players
Expatriate footballers in Chile